The following are the winners of the 1st annual ENnie Awards, held in 2001:

References

External links
 2001 ENnie Awards

 
ENnies winners